Mapranam is a village in Irinjalakuda. It is under the municipality of the  district of Thrissur, in the state of Kerala, India. It is a predominantly residential zone with facilities such as grocery stores, schools, medical clinics, libraries, and temples, churches and mosques.

References
4  .SPKCMM School Madayikonam

Suburbs of Thrissur city
Villages in Thrissur district
Irinjalakuda